The 2021 Rafael Nadal tennis season officially began on 9 February 2021, with the start of the Australian Open.

Yearly summary

Early hard court season

ATP Cup
Rafael Nadal was scheduled to begin his season at the ATP Cup. However, despite being on the Spanish team, he did not play any matches due to minor back issues.

Australian Open

At the 2021 Australian Open, Nadal lost in the quarterfinals to Stefanos Tsitsipas, despite being two sets to love up. This marked only the second time Nadal has lost a grand slam match after being two sets up. It was overall the third time he lost from 2 sets up, the others happened at the US Open 2015 to Fabio Fognini, and Miami 2005 to Roger Federer in the final when Masters finals were best of 5.

Indian Wells Masters
Indian Wells Masters was scheduled to take place in March 2021 but was postponed due to coronavirus concerns.

Miami Open
Nadal withdrew from the Miami Open.

Spring clay court season

Monte-Carlo Masters
Nadal won his first two matches losing a total of just 5 games in both combined, but then lost to Andrey Rublev in the quarterfinals in three sets.

Barcelona Open
Nadal saved a match point to defeat Stefanos Tsitsipas, in 3 hours and 38 minutes, the longest final since 1991 (when records began). This was his record-extending 12th title at the event.

Madrid Open
Nadal lost to Alexander Zverev in the quarterfinals.

Italian Open
Nadal saved two match points to defeat Denis Shapovalov. He then beat Alexander Zverev and Reilly Opelka to reach the final, where he defeated longtime rival Novak Djokovic in three sets.

French Open

At the French Open, Nadal entered as the heavy favorite seeking to become the first man to win 21 majors. He reached the semifinals after wins over Jannik Sinner and Diego Schwartzman, where he encountered Novak Djokovic in a rematch of the previous year's final. There, Nadal was upset by eventual champion Djokovic in four sets, in only his third-ever loss at the French Open.

Grass court season

Wimbledon

Nadal withdrew from both Wimbledon and the Olympics, citing schedule reasons.

North American hard court season

Washington (Citi Open)

Nadal made his Washington debut in 2021.  He faced Jack Sock in his opener, his first match since losing to Novak Djokovic at the French Open.  Nadal recovered from a break down in the third set, prevailing in a final set tiebreak.  He lost in the round of 16 to Lloyd Harris (tennis) in three sets.

Following more injury problems, Nadal withdrew from Toronto and Cincinnati, and, on August 20th, ended his season, citing his ongoing foot injury as the main issue.

All matches
This table chronicles all the matches of Rafael Nadal in 2021.

Singles matches

Exhibition matches

Singles

Schedule
Per Rafael Nadal, this is his current 2021 schedule (subject to change). The ATP rankings are currently affected by the COVID-19 pandemic; they are on a Best of 24-month basis through the week of 15 March 2021. Until then, all the events are non-mandatory and players can use the best result from the same event in that 24-month span.

Singles schedule

Yearly records

Head-to-head matchups
Rafael Nadal has a  ATP match win–loss record in the 2021 season. Bold indicates player was ranked top 10 at the time of at least one meeting. The following list is ordered by number of wins:

  Cameron Norrie 3–0
  Alexei Popyrin 2–0
  Jannik Sinner 2–0
  Carlos Alcaraz 1–0
  Pablo Carreño Busta 1–0
  Federico Delbonis 1–0
  Laslo Đere 1–0
  Grigor Dimitrov 1–0
  Fabio Fognini 1–0
  Richard Gasquet 1–0
  Ilya Ivashka 1–0
  Michael Mmoh 1–0
  Kei Nishikori 1–0
  Reilly Opelka 1–0
  Diego Schwartzman 1–0
  Denis Shapovalov 1–0
  Jack Sock 1–0
  Stefanos Tsitsipas 1–1
  Alexander Zverev 1–1
  Novak Djokovic 1–1
  Lloyd Harris 0–1
  Andrey Rublev 0–1

* Statistics correct .

Top 10 wins

Finals

Singles: 2 (2 titles)

(**) signifies tournaments where Nadal won the title after saving at least one match point.

Earnings

Bold font denotes tournament win

 Figures in United States dollars (USD) unless noted. 
source：2021 Singles Activity
source：2021 Doubles Activity

Television

At the Barcelona Open, Nadal's semifinals match versus Pablo Carreño Busta averaged 773,000 viewers on RTVE's La 1 and 115,000 on #Vamos. The final match versus Stefanos Tsitsipas averaged 1.5 million viewers on La 1 (equivalent to a 11.3% share), 87,000 on #Vamos and 68,000 on Movistar Deportes.

At the Madrid Open, his quarter-finals match versus Alexander Zverev averaged 447,000 viewers on Teledeporte.

At the Italian Open, his final match versus Novak Djokovic averaged 363,00 viewers on #Vamos.

See also
 2021 ATP Tour
 2021 Novak Djokovic tennis season

Notes

References

External links 
  
ATP tour profile

Rafael Nadal tennis seasons
Nadal
Nadal
2021 in Spanish sport